Wright Peak is the 16th highest peak in the High Peaks of the Adirondack Park, and is located in the MacIntyre Range in the town of North Elba, New York, in Essex County, New York.  Named for N.Y. Governor Silas Wright (1795–1847), Wright is the northernmost peak in the MacIntyre Range, and is one of the windiest peaks in the park, as well as one of the best for back-country skiing. There are long slides from the summit that lead to Marcy Dam which are often skied in the winter.

The usual approach to Wright Peak is from the Adirondak Loj, heading  up the Van Hovenberg trail, then ascending the steep MacIntyre Range Trail to the junction for Algonquin Peak; a left turn takes the climber .4 miles and up the last few hundred feet of elevation through the alpine zone.  Wright is often hiked in conjunction with Algonquin and sometimes Iroquois Peak by peakbaggers, making for one of the toughest hikes in the region.

B-47 crash site 
On January 16, 1962, a B-47 bomber on a training mission crashed into Wright Peak, killing all four crewmen. Their training mission involved practicing low bombing runs over Watertown, NY. Due to inclement weather, the bomber veered about 30 miles off course, and into the High Peaks region. The aircraft made its impact just feet below the summit of Wright Peak. Pieces of the wreckage can still be found on the summit, along with a plaque near the impact site. Some of the crash debris is quite large, and hikers making the trip to the summit have been known to take small pieces down with them as souvenirs.

Notes

External links 
 
  Peakbagger.com: Wright Peak
  Summitpost.org: Wright Peak
 Crash of the Wright Peak B-47
 
 

Mountains of Essex County, New York
Adirondack High Peaks
Mountains of New York (state)